Robert Norval was an Australian rugby league footballer who played one match as a hooker for the Eastern Suburbs against North Sydney in 1940.

References

Year of birth missing
Year of death missing
Australian rugby league players
Sydney Roosters players
Rugby league hookers